Brusselmans is a surname. Notable people with the surname include:

Filip Brusselmans (born 1997), Belgian politician and political activist
Herman Brusselmans (born 1957), Belgian writer, poet, and playwright
Jean Brusselmans (1884–1953), Belgian painter
Michel Brusselmans (1886–1960), Belgian composer